Dillon Carmichael (born November 8, 1993) is an American country music singer. He signed to Riser House Entertainment in 2017  where he released his debut single, "Dancing Away With My Heart".  In 2021 Carmichael released the Hot Beer EP, which included the title single. Later in 2021, Carmichael delivered his second album, Son of A, consisting of fourteen tracks with songs written by Michael Hardy and Ashley Gorley. As well as songs written with Jessi Alexander, and David Lee Murphy.

Biography
Carmichael grew up in Burgin, Kentucky. He came from a musical family that included several other musicians, including two of his uncles: singers John Michael Montgomery and Eddie Montgomery, the latter a member of Montgomery Gentry.

Carmichael began playing guitar at age twelve, and joined his friends at talent shows in his area. At age 17, he and his family were contacted by a representative of The Song Factory publishing company, who encouraged Carmichael to move to Nashville, Tennessee after he had graduated from high school. In 2018, he was recommended to record producer Dave Cobb, who produced Carmichael's debut album Hell on an Angel in 2018. On August 21, 2018, Carmichael made his Grand Ole Opry debut.  He had spent a year and half as a security guard at the Opry from 2015-2016." In addition to playing at the Grand Ole Opry, Carmichael has played numerous festivals and toured with Brooks & Dunn and Lynyrd Skynyrd

Rolling Stone Country described the album as "Featuring his signature booming baritone vocals and a sonic blend that mixes the hard-nosed Outlaw country with the melodic edge of Southern rock." In 2020, Dillon charted on Country Airplay with the single release "I Do for You".

Discography

Albums

Singles

References

American country singer-songwriters
Country musicians from Kentucky
Living people
People from Mercer County, Kentucky
21st-century American male musicians
American male singer-songwriters
1993 births